Rui Machida (町田瑠唯; born 8 March 1993) is a Japanese basketball player who plays for the Fujitsu Red Wave of the Women's Japan Basketball League (WJBL). She represented Japan in the women's tournament at the 2016 Summer Olympics and at the women's tournament at the 2020 Summer Olympics, winning a silver medal.

At the 2020 Summer Olympics, she set an Olympic record with 18 assists in Japan's 87–71 semifinals win against France.

Career 
She participated at the 2015  FIBA Women’s Asia Cup, 2017 Women’s Asia Cup, and 2019 Women’s Asia Cup.

WNBA career statistics

Regular season

|-
| align="left" | 2022
| align="left" | Washington
| 36 || 2 || 12.9 || .310 || .206 || .667 || 1.1 || 2.6 || 0.4 || 0.1 || 1.1 || 1.8
|-
| align="left" | Career
| align="left" | 1 year, 1 team
| 36 || 2 || 12.9 || .310 || .206 || .667 || 1.1 || 2.6 || 0.4 || 0.1 || 1.1 || 1.8

Playoffs

|-
| align="left" | 2022
| align="left" | Washington
| 2 || 0 || 5.5 || .667 || .500 || .000 || 0.5 || 0.5 || 0.0 || 0.0 || 0.0 || 2.5
|-
| align="left" | Career
| align="left" | 1 year, 1 team
| 2 || 0 || 5.5 || .667 || .500 || .000 || 0.5 || 0.5 || 0.0 || 0.0 || 0.0 || 2.5

References

External links

1993 births
Living people
Japanese women's basketball players
Basketball players at the 2016 Summer Olympics
Basketball players at the 2020 Summer Olympics
Olympic basketball players of Japan
Basketball players at the 2014 Asian Games
Asian Games medalists in basketball
Asian Games bronze medalists for Japan
Point guards
Medalists at the 2014 Asian Games
Sportspeople from Hokkaido
Olympic medalists in basketball
Olympic silver medalists for Japan
Medalists at the 2020 Summer Olympics
Washington Mystics players
Undrafted Women's National Basketball Association players
21st-century Japanese women